Posht Tang-e Parīan (also Romanized as Posht Tang-e Parīān; also known as Parīān-e Posht Tang, Owlād, Posht-e Tangeh) is a village in Gol Gol Rural District, in the Central District of Kuhdasht County, Lorestan Province, Iran. At the 2006 census, its population was 142, in 30 families.

References 

Towns and villages in Kuhdasht County